Ratt is the sixth studio album by American glam metal band Ratt. Often referred to as "1999" by fans (partially to avoid confusion with their EP, which was also self-titled), the album saw the band's musical direction shift to a more blues-influenced hard rock sound and further away from their previous glam metal roots. This is the first studio album to feature bassist Robbie Crane.

Track listing

Personnel
Ratt
Stephen Pearcy – lead vocals
Warren DeMartini – guitars, backing vocals
Robbie Crane – bass guitar, backing vocals
Bobby Blotzer – drums

Production
Richie Zito – producer
Noel Golden, Shawn Berman – engineers
Dave Dominguez, Posie Mulaid, Kenny Ybarra – assistant engineers
Rob Jacobs – mixing
Mike Shipley – mixing of "Over the Edge"
Dave Donnelly – mastering
John Kalodner – A&R

Charts

References

1999 albums
Ratt albums
Portrait Records albums